Orphaned articles from June 2017
All orphaned articles

Lynne V. Abruzzo is an American science researcher. , she was at Ohio State University and an elected fellow of the American Association for the Advancement of Science.

Life 
Abruzzo received a Ph.D. in pathology in 1984 and an M.D. with honors in 1986 from the University of Chicago. Abruzzo completed postdoctoral fellowships in hematopathology at the National Cancer Institute, NIH; in molecular biology at the National Institute of Diabetes Digestive, and Kidney Diseases, NIH; and in clinical cytogenetics at Baylor College of Medicine.

References

External links
https://pathology.osu.edu/ext/faculty/abruzzo.html

 

Year of birth missing (living people)
Living people
Fellows of the American Association for the Advancement of Science
American scientists